David Flusser (Hebrew: דוד פלוסר; born 1917; died 2000) was an Israeli professor of Early Christianity and Judaism of the Second Temple Period at the Hebrew University of Jerusalem.

Biography 
David Flusser was born in Vienna on September 15, 1917. He grew up in Příbram (Przibram, Pibrans, Freiberg i.B.), middle Bohemia, Czechoslovakia and attended the University of Prague. There he met a pastor, Josef Perl, who piqued his interest in Jesus and Christianity. As a young schoolboy his parents had sent him to a Christian school, but in Palestine during the late 1930s he became an observant Jew. Flusser emigrated to Mandatory Palestine, where he completed his doctorate at the Hebrew University of Jerusalem in 1957. He later taught in the Comparative Religions department for many years, mentoring many future scholars.
 
David Flusser was the cousin of Vilém Flusser.

Flusser died in Jerusalem on September 15, 2000, on his 83rd birthday. He was survived by his wife, Chana, 2 sons, Yochanan and Uri, and 7 grandchildren.

Academic career
Flusser was a devout Orthodox Jew who applied his study of the Torah and Talmud to the study of ancient Greek, Roman and Arabic texts, as well as the Hebrew of the Dead Sea Scrolls.
Flusser scrutinized the ancient Jewish and Christian texts for evidence of the Jewish roots of Christianity. While critically distinguishing the historical Jesus from the portrayal in the Gospels and other Christian writings, Flusser saw Jesus as an authentic Jew, misunderstood by his followers. 

David Satran, a professor of comparative religion at the Hebrew University of Jerusalem, said, "Dr. Flusser was rather remarkable in his strong insistence that not only was Jesus a Jew from birth to death, but that Jesus did nothing that could be interpreted as a revolt or questioning of the basic principles of the Judaism at the time." Personally, Flusser viewed Jesus as a tsadik with keen spiritual insight and a "high self-awareness" that near-contemporaries similarly expressed, such as Hillel the Elder in the Talmud and the "Teacher of Righteousness" in certain Dead Sea Scrolls.

Flusser pursued his research at a time when many Jews blamed Christianity for Nazism. During his trial in Israel, the Gestapo officer Adolf Eichmann refused to take an oath on the New Testament, insisting he would swear only "in the name of God." Flusser commented in an editorial in The Jerusalem Post: "I do not know who is the God in whose name Eichmann swore, but I am certain that it is neither the God of Israel nor the God of the Christian church. It should now become clear to the strongest Jewish opponents of Christianity that Christianity per se imposes limitations, and that the greatest crime against our people was not committed in the name of the Christian faith".

Flusser published over 1,000 articles in Hebrew, German, English, and other languages. The results of his many academic writings can be found in his book, Jesus (1965), whose augmented second edition The Sage from Galilee (1998) was updated to incorporate his later research and views on Jesus.

One of Flusser's views which was particularly influential in Germany, being taken up and advocated also by Joachim Jeremias, was the suggestion that the name Yeshu used of Jesus in the Talmud was "in no way abusive" but was in fact a Galilean dialect version, since according to Flusser, Galileans found the final ayin of the name Yeshua difficult to pronounce. Flusser also took the view (1992) that the Birkat haMinim was originally in reference to Sadducees, not Judaeo-Christians.

Flusser was trained as a philologist and thus the study of Greek, Latin, Hebrew, and Aramaic manuscripts was central to his research interests. He was primarily interested in the medieval Book of Yosippon which claimed much of his time from 1940-1982 when he finished his edition of this medieval history of the Second Temple period. His studies of the Dead Sea Scrolls and the New Testament manuscripts illuminated both the contemporary period and the echoes in the Book of Yosippon. Flusser once quipped that he would like to chat with Jesus and the anonymous author of the Book of Yosippon once he reached the "academy on high". His final biography would emphasize his medieval training and interests.

Awards and recognition
Flusser was a member of the Israel Academy of Sciences and Humanities and received the Israel Prize in 1980, for his contributions to the study of Jewish history. Lawrence Schiffman, chairman of the Skirball department of Hebrew and Judaic studies at New York University, credited him with pioneering "the modern study of Christianity in the state of Israel in a scholarly context".

Selected works 

 - e-book only

See also 
Jerusalem school hypothesis
Jerusalem School of Synoptic Research
List of Israel Prize recipients

References

External links 
 "One of the world's foremost Jewish authorities on the New Testament and early Christianity"
 Jewish-Christian Relations
 Bibliography of the Writings of David Flusser by Malcolm Lowe
 David Flusser interview with Roy Blizzard
 The Scrolls from the Dead Sea
David Flusser, "Jesus' Temptation and its Jewish Background"
David Flusser, "Sanctus and Gloria"
David Flusser, "The Torah in the Sermon on the Mount"
David Flusser, "Luke 9:51-56—A Hebrew Fragment"
Peter Tomson, "Review: David Flusser’s, Die rabbinischen Gleichnisse und der Gleichniserzähler Jesus (1981)" (Flusser's book on parables)
David Flusser, "‘Everything Written…in the Psalms About Me’ (Luke 24:44)"
David Flusser, “Midrash in the New Testament”

Israel Prize in history recipients
Israel Prize in history of the Jewish people recipients
Members of the Israel Academy of Sciences and Humanities
Austrian Jews
People from Příbram
Israeli people of Czech-Jewish descent
Israeli people of Austrian-Jewish descent
Israeli Orthodox Jews
1917 births
2000 deaths
Czech people of Austrian descent
Critics of Christianity
Charles University alumni
Czechoslovak emigrants to Israel
Academic staff of the Hebrew University of Jerusalem
Historians of Christianity
Historians of Jews and Judaism
Jewish historians
20th-century Israeli historians